Mitromorpha columbellaria is a species of sea snail, a marine gastropod mollusk in the family Mitromorphidae.

Description
The Mitromorpha columbellaria has a brownish-tan, spiral shell. Its common size is 6mm.

Distribution
This species of sea snail is native to Spain, particularly in the cities of Granada and Punta de la Mona; also off Italy and Algeria

References

 Mifsud C. (2001). The genus Mitromorpha Carpenter, 1865 (Neogastropoda, Turridae), and its sub-genera with notes on the European species. Published by the Author, Rabat, Malta 32 pp.

External links
 Scacchi, A. (1836). Catalogus Conchyliorum regni Neapolitani. Neapoli [Naples], Typis Filiatre-Sebetii 18 p., 1 pl
  Bucquoy E., Dautzenberg P. & Dollfus G. (1882–1886). Les mollusques marins du Roussillon. Tome Ier. Gastropodes. Paris, J.B. Baillière & fils 570 p., 66 pl.
 Philippi, R. A. (1844). Enumeratio molluscorum Siciliae cum viventium tum in tellure tertiaria fossilium, quae in itinere suo observavit. Volumen secundum continens addenda et emendanda, nec non comparationem faunae recentis Siciliae cum faunis aliarum terrarum et com fauna periodi tertiariae. Eduard Anton, Halle
 Brusina S. (1866). Contribuzione pella fauna dei molluschi dalmati. Verhandlungen der Kaiserlich-königlichen Zoologisch-botanisch Gesellschaft in Wien 16: 1–134
 Pallary P. (1900). Coquilles marines du littoral du Départment d'Oran
 Journal de Conchyliologie, 48(3): 211–422, pl. 68 Locard A. (1886). Prodrome de malacologie française. Catalogue général des mollusques vivants de France. Mollusque marins. Lyon, H. Georg & Paris, Baillière : pp. X + 778
 Amati B., Smriglio C. & Oliverio M. (2015). Revision of the Recent Mediterranean species of Mitromorpha Carpenter, 1865 (Gastropoda, Conoidea, Mitromorphidae) with the description of seven new species. Zootaxa. 3931(2): 151–195
 
 

columbellaria
Gastropods described in 1836